Marta Urbanová, married Daňhelová (born 14 October 1960 in České Budějovice) is a Czech former field hockey player who competed in the 1980 Summer Olympics.

References

External links
 

1960 births
Living people
Czech female field hockey players
Olympic field hockey players of Czechoslovakia
Field hockey players at the 1980 Summer Olympics
Olympic silver medalists for Czechoslovakia
Olympic medalists in field hockey
Sportspeople from České Budějovice
Medalists at the 1980 Summer Olympics